Arsh or ARSH may refer to:

 ARSH, a type of arylsulfatase
 'Arsh, a place in Taiz Governorate, Yemen
 Al-Arsh, or Throne of God, in Islam
 Arsh, a star in the constellation Lepus
 Arsh, an ethnic group of the Koibal people in Southern Siberia

See also
Arsha (disambiguation)
 Arshi, a character in the Mahabharat